Saqi (also Romanized as Sāqī; also known as Sāgi) is a village in Amiriyeh Rural District, in the Central District of Arak County, Markazi Province, Iran. At the 2006 census, its population was 567, in 134 families.

References 

Populated places in Arak County